Angeline Gustave (born 30 January 2001) is a Haitian footballer who plays as a midfielder for AS Tigresses and the Haiti women's national team.

International career
Gustave made a senior appearance for Haiti on 3 October 2019.

References

External links 
 

2001 births
Living people
Women's association football midfielders
Haitian women's footballers
People from Ouest (department)
Haiti women's international footballers